Radio Otvorena Mreža or ROM is the first Bosnian nonprofit radio station, broadcasting from Sarajevo.

Radio Otvorena Mreža began broadcasting in February 2012.

History and programming
As a community radio, station focuses on NGO news, contemporary pop music, talk shows and national news.

The holder of a broadcasting license for a non-profit community radio, Radio Otvorena Mreža is an association of citizens NGO Otvorena Mreža. Commonly called ROM, radio has a 9 transmitters and broadcasting stations across Bosnia and Herzegovina, which provides extensive local coverage. Radio also available via Internet, as well as through programs of partner radio stations in the region (cooperation with the Naxi radio from Belgrade, Radio Cafe 075 from Netherlands etc.).

Radio Otvorena Mreža together with TV Pink BH produces two TV shows, morning program Udri Muški and TV show about humanitarian actions in Bosnia and Herzegovina called "Hrabri ljudi".

TV shows Centralni Dnevnik hosted by Senad Hadžifejzović and Face to Face produced by Face TV from Sarajevo are also broadcast on this radio.

Frequencies
The program is currently broadcast at 10 frequencies:

 Sarajevo 
 Banja Luka 
 Srebrenica 
 Tuzla 
 Mostar 
 Jajce 
 Bihać 
 Konjic 
 Trebinje 
 Zenica

References

External links 
 Otvorena Mreža Official website 
 Communications Regulatory Agency of Bosnia and Herzegovina 
 Otvorena Mreža in Facebook

See also 
List of radio stations in Bosnia and Herzegovina

Sarajevo
Radio stations established in 2012
Mass media in Sarajevo